Mithril is a fictional metal from J. R. R. Tolkien's Middle-earth fantasy writings.

Mithril or mythril may also refer to:
 Mithril (band), a Celtic music / World music quartet
 Mithril (Full Metal Panic!), fictional paramilitary organization in Full Metal Panic! series
 Mithril Capital Management, founded by Peter Thiel
 Mythril, a recurring fictional metal in the Final Fantasy series